Bulimulus albermalensis is a species of  tropical air-breathing land snail, a pulmonate gastropod mollusk in the subfamily Bulimulinae.

This species is endemic to Ecuador.  Its natural habitat is subtropical or tropical dry forests. It is threatened by habitat loss.

References

Bulimulus
Endemic gastropods of the Galápagos Islands
Gastropods described in 1917
Taxonomy articles created by Polbot